Panjshir may refer to:

 Panjshir Valley, Afghanistan
 Panjshir Province, Afghanistan
 Panjshir River, Afghanistan
 Panjshir conflict, Afghanistan
 Panjshir offensives (Soviet–Afghan War), Afghanistan
 Panjshir Front, Afghanistan
 Panjshir University, Afghanistan
 Panjshir alliance
 Panjshir Lion